The Zec de Cap-Chat (formerly designated "Réserve faunique de Cap-Chat" (Wildlife Sanctuary of Cap-Chat)) is a "zone d'exploitation contrôlée" (Controlled harvesting zone) (ZEC) located in unorganized territory of Rivière-Bonjour (River Good morning), in MRC La Matanie Regional County Municipality, in the administrative region of Bas-Saint-Laurent, in Quebec, in Canada.

This zec is administered by "Société de gestion de la rivière Cap-Chat".

Geography 

"Zec de Cap-Chat" is located in the Gaspé Peninsula.

The host entry of Zec is easily accessible. Visitors can use the route 132 along the southern coast of St. Lawrence River, to the municipality of Cap-Chat. The visitors then head south along "rue des Fonds", rue des Érables (the Maples Street) and "chemin du Cassette".

Visitors can access the "camping du Ruisseau l'Islet" (Creek Islet campsite) (accessible by car) or Platforms Prospector (accessible by hiking).

From the edge of the "ZEC de Cap-Chat", the Cap-Chat River flows north-east, then north on 57.5 km to its mouth in the St. Lawrence River, in the municipality of Cap-Chat. And  of this river is incorporated as a zone d'exploitation contrôlée (Controlled Harvesting Zone) which turn to be the ZEC de la Rivière-Cap-Chat.

Wildlife 

Hunting is regulated on the ZEC. Hunters will need to consider quotas and follow the procedures (hunting season by species and gear hunting). The main species hunted on the ZEC are: coyote, moose, deer, black bear, grouse and Hare.

Toponymy 
The term "Cap-Chat" refers to a set of designated places in the region of Cap-Chat lordship, two ZECs, township, city, bay, roads and streets, rivers, tip, canyon and butte.

According to the Commission de toponymie du Québec (Geographical Names Board of Québec), the term "Cap-Chat" appears in 29 names on the territory of the Quebec, including the city, the river, the small-river, ZEC, the lordship township, bay and roads.

See also 

 St. Lawrence River 
 Gaspé 
 Zec de la Rivière-Cap-Chat 
 Gaspésie National Park
 Zone d'exploitation contrôlée (Controlled Harvesting Zone) (ZEC)

References 

Zone d'exploitation contrôlée
Protected areas of Bas-Saint-Laurent
Protected areas of Gaspésie–Îles-de-la-Madeleine
Protected areas established in 1992
1992 establishments in Quebec